Aisa Amittu (born September 6, 1951) is an Inuit sculptor and printmaker. He was born in Puvirnituq, Nunavik.

He first exhibited publicly in 1989 at the Inuit Galerie in Mannheim, Germany. His work is included in the collections of the Musée national des beaux-arts du Québec and  the National Gallery of Canada.

References

1951 births
20th-century Canadian artists
21st-century Canadian artists
Inuit sculptors
Living people